is a Japanese television jidaigeki or period drama that was broadcast in 1985. It is the 24th in the Hissatsu series. After appearing in several Hissatsu series as a guest villan actor, Masahiko Tsugawa won leading role in the Hissatsu series.

Ryūji used to be a famous professional killer but retired from it. His profession is a peddler (he sells kimono) now but one day he comes back from his retirement by his old friend's last words.

Cast
 Masahiko Tsugawa: Ryūji
 Shin Takuma: Shinkichi
 Hisako Manda: Okura
 Machiko Washio : Ofuji
 Midori Nishizaki : Okō

Directors
Eiichi Kudo directed episode 1,2,5

References

1985 Japanese television series debuts
1980s drama television series
Jidaigeki television series